Luis Alberto Torres Rodríguez (born December 5, 1981) is a Colombian footballer who currently plays for Luis Ángel Firpo in El Salvador.

External links
 El Grafico.com Profile 
 

1981 births
Living people
Sportspeople from Cartagena, Colombia
Association football defenders
Colombian footballers
Atlético Bucaramanga footballers
Independiente Santa Fe footballers
C.D. Dragón footballers
C.D. Vista Hermosa footballers
Atlético Balboa footballers
C.D. Luis Ángel Firpo footballers
Expatriate footballers in Guatemala
Colombian expatriate footballers
Expatriate footballers in El Salvador